André Wetzel (born 3 November 1951) is a Dutch former footballer and manager currently for HVV Den Haag.

Career

Playing career
André Wetzel started his playing career with HFC Haarlem in 1972. In 1975, he joined FC Amsterdam, where he played over 100 games. In 1978, he moved to his hometown club of ADO Den Haag. He finished his career at Stormvogels Telstar in 1982.

Coaching career
He started his coaching career in 1997 when he joined ADO Den Haag as assistant manager. He then went to FC Den Bosch where he was assistant to Jan Poortvliet. During this time he was also a youth coach for the Dutch national team. His first managerial role came in 2004 when he took over the reins at Willem II Tilburg after being assistant there for two years. He was only there for a matter of months, however, as he took over at Qatari club Al-Jazeera Sports Club where he also lasted only months. He returned to management in 2005 with Belgian Second Division club KV Mechelen. In 2006, he took charge at VVV-Venlo where he remained until 2008 when he took over at ADO Den Haag. On April 2009 he was moved into a technical directorship position, with Raymond Atteveld replacing him, only to be dismissed altogether later in December. On 9 December 2010, UAE side Al-Jazira Club appointed him as a technical director. In December 2011, he was appointed manager of HBS Craeyenhout.

References

External links

1951 births
Living people
Dutch football managers
Association football midfielders
Dutch footballers
Eredivisie managers
HVV Den Haag managers
VVV-Venlo managers
ADO Den Haag managers
Footballers from The Hague
Sportspeople from Surabaya
Eredivisie players
Eerste Divisie players
ADO Den Haag players
HFC Haarlem players
SC Telstar players
Willem II (football club) managers
K.V. Mechelen managers
HBS Craeyenhout football managers
Al Jazira Club managers
ASWH managers
Willem II (football club) non-playing staff